Jawad Dawood (born May 9, 1982 in Quetta, Balochistan, Pakistan) is a Pakistani Canadian cricketer currently playing for the Canada national cricket team. He is a left hand batsman.

References

1982 births
Canadian cricketers
Canada One Day International cricketers
Pakistani emigrants to Canada
Naturalized citizens of Canada
Living people
Cricketers from Quetta
Pakistani cricketers
21st-century Canadian people